Frank Osborne Cameron (17 April 1892 – 6 February 1986) was an Australian rules footballer who played with University in the Victorian Football League.

Sources

Holmesby, Russell & Main, Jim (2007). The Encyclopedia of AFL Footballers. 7th ed. Melbourne: Bas Publishing.

1892 births
University Football Club players
Australian rules footballers from Victoria (Australia)
Australian military personnel of World War I
1986 deaths